This is a list of Members of Parliament (MPs) elected to the 7th Parliament of the Jatiya Sangsad, the National Parliament of Bangladesh, by Bangladeshi constituencies. The list includes both MPs elected at the 1996 general election, held on 12 June 1996, and nominated women's members for reserved seats and those subsequently elected in by-elections.

Members

Elected members of parliament

Members of the Reserved Women's Seat

References 

Members of the Jatiya Sangsad by term
7th Jatiya Sangsad members
Jatiya Sangsad